The 1965 British League season was the 31st season of the top tier of speedway in the United Kingdom. It was also the first known as the new British League which was formed in 1965, along with the British Speedway Promoters Association (BSPA). The league was an amalgamation of the National League and the Provincial League.

Summary
Middlesbrough Bears did not join the new league and Norwich Stars had closed for good. Halifax Dukes were new entrants.1929-1977

West Ham Hammers were the first ever British League winners. It was their first league success since 1937. The West Ham team included Scot Ken McKinlay who finished the season third in the averages at 10.72 and the Norwegian champion Sverre Harrfeldt who finished fifth in the averages. They were supported well by British internationals Norman Hunter and Malcolm Simmons. The West Ham team completed the double when winning the British League Knockout Cup. In the final they defeated Exeter Falcons 63-33. The season was not a complete success because during a challenge match at West Ham Stadium a junior rider called David John Wills was killed in a race after crashing. Wimbledon Dons headed by leading Swedish rider Olle Nygren fought West Ham throughout the season and only lost the league by a single point.

Final table
M = Matches; W = Wins; D = Draws; L = Losses; Pts = Total Points

Knockout Cup
West Ham Hammers won the Knockout Cup and completed the double of league and cup.

Final leading averages

Riders & final averages
Belle Vue

 9.65
 8.06
 7.52
 6.37
 6.03
 5.50
 5.25
 4.12
 4.10
 1.67

Coventry

 11.12
 8.74
 8.65 
 6.30
 6.00
 4.27
 3.08
 2.12
 0.64

Cradley Heath

 9.27
 7.78
 7.63
 6.29
 5.87
 5.10
 5.09
 4.79
 3.35
 3.31
 2.89
 1.65

Edinburgh

 9.35
 7.34
 6.61
 5.42
 4.94
 4.83
 4.42
 4.17
 3.88
 2.50

Exeter

 9.24
 7.72 
 7.62 
 7.37
 6.05
 6.00
 6.00
 5.78
4.36
 3.61

Glasgow

 10.28
 7.61 
 7.16
 6.58
 6.12
 5.23
 4.76
 4.12

Hackney

 8.69 
 8.51 
 7.51
 6.79
 6.60
 5.49
 5.15
 5.04
 3.45

Halifax

 9.43
 9.06
 8.00
 7.29
 6.30
 4.91
 4.07
 4.00
 3.75
 2.93

Long Eaton

 7.96
 (Kid Bodie) 6.84
 6.64
 6.55
 5.19
 5.08
 4.77
 3.45
 2.61

Newcastle

 8.76
 8.75
 7.35
 7.30
 6.23
 5.92
 5.77
 5.44
 2.92

Newport

 9.00
 7.90
 7.78
 7.74
 5.88
 5.77
 5.41
 4.88

Oxford

 10.16
 10.03 
 9.90 
 4.53
 4.51
 4.34
 4.25
 3.83
 3.32
 2.45
 1.71

Poole

 9.45
 9.07
 7.76
 7.43
 6.14
 5.52
 3.23
 3.04
 0.61

Sheffield

 8.69
 8.06 
 7.43 
 6.05
 5.63
 5.08
 4.54

Swindon

 10.93
 10.48
 8.83
 4.29
 4.00
 3.93
 3.24
 2.00
 1.47

West Ham

 10.83 
 10.46
 9.42
 6.56
 4.65
 4.48
 3.65
 2.80
 2.40

Wimbledon

 10.22
 9.14
 8.55
 6.77
 6.01
 4.91
 2.60
 1.44

Wolverhampton

 8.70
 8.33
 8.19
 7.39
 7.20
 6.98
 5.64
 4.62

See also
List of United Kingdom Speedway League Champions
Knockout Cup (speedway)

References

British League
1965 in British motorsport
1965 in speedway